Free Burghers (Dutch: Vrijburgher, Afrikaans: Vryburger) were early European settlers at the Cape of Good Hope in the 18th century. The introduction of Free Burghers to the Cape is regarded as the beginning of a permanent settlement of Europeans in South Africa and the inception of the Boer people.

Settlement at the Cape

European workforce 

The Dutch East India Company (Vereenigde Oostindische Compagnie (VOC) in Dutch) had been formed in the Dutch Republic in 1602, and the Dutch entered into competition for commerce in Southeast Asia. The end of the Thirty Years' War in 1648 saw European soldiers and refugees widely dispersed across Europe. Immigrants from Germany, Scandinavia, and Switzerland journeyed to Holland in the hope of finding employment at the VOC. Beyond this, the Company filled its ranks with farm labourers, artisans and unskilled workers from both rural and urban areas who spoke a number of variations of French, Dutch, German and Scandinavian languages. Contractors were obliged to remain in the employment of the Company for a minimum of five years excluding the six months that the journey could have taken and were not permitted to return home during this time.

Protestant work ethic 

The Protestant work ethic, the Calvinist work ethic or the Puritan work ethic is a work ethic concept in theology, sociology, economics, and history that emphasizes that hard work, discipline and frugality are a result of a person's subscription to the values espoused by the Protestant faith, particularly Calvinism. One of the causes for the Dutch Golden Age is attributed to the migration of skilled craftsmen to the Dutch Republic of which Protestants were especially well-represented. Economists Ronald Findlay and Kevin H. O'Rourke attribute part of the Dutch ascendancy to its Protestant work ethic based on Calvinism, which promoted thrift and education. This contributed to "the lowest interest rates and the highest literacy rates in Europe. The abundance of capital made it possible to maintain an impressive stock of wealth, embodied not only in the large fleet but in the plentiful stocks of an array of commodities that were used to stabilize prices and take advantage of profit opportunities."

The first freemen 

In 1656, Commander Jan van Riebeeck considered the idea of freemen at the Cape, he was of the opinion that the cost of supplying housing and protection to such free households would be too great. The Directors of the VOC however, were in favour to establish freemen under favourable conditions.

Harman’s Colony  
On the 21st of February 1657, following an application process where the best applicants were selected, a party of five were allowed to select land which they could occupy and use as freemen. They chose an area about fifteen kilometres away from the Fort de Goede Hoop on the other side of the Liesbeek River. They were allowed to select a piece of land as long and broad as they wished, on condition that they were to remain on the other side of the river. The area of land which they occupied were named Amstel, or the Groene veld.

Stephen’s Colony 

Another party of four selected a spot nearer to the fort next to the Liesbeek River at Rondebosch opposite the Groenevelt. The area which was allocated to the freemen of Stephen's Colony were named Hollandsche Tuin (English: Dutch Garden).

Free burgher status 

On the 19th of February 1657, Commander Jan van Riebeeck travelled to a spot about 19km to the flats behind Table Mountain to select a spot where a fort could be constructed to protect the lands which were to be cultivated. European workers on several occasions asked permission from the Commander of the Cape at the time, Van Riebeeck, to be discharged from the service of the VOC, in order to cultivate the lands. On the 20th of February, Van Riebeeck accompanied them to mark out their plots and draw up preliminary conditions.

Servants of the VOC could return to their homes in Europe after their term of service had been carried out. Yet some workers chose to be discharged from service earlier than their term in order to live permanently at the Cape. The families of the free burghers were then brought from Europe to South Africa. Others after serving their term of service at the VOC also decided to stay at the Cape rather than returning to Europe who also received free burgher status. After the founding of the two free burgher colonies in February 1657, many more requested to be discharged from the service of the VOC. Letters of freedom were not issued to everyone who applied. By the 25th of September, 20 applications had been received and only five of them were enrolled as freemen.

Some of the men received limited free burgher status with conditions favourable to both the VOC and the applicant. Limited in terms of the duration of term which the applicant would be allowed to maintain free burgher status. The duration of the five who were enrolled as free burghers in September 1657 is as follows:

Settlement map

Living Conditions

Occupations 

The early free burghers were mostly petty officers with families, who drew money instead of rations, and who could derive a portion of their food from their gardens, as well as sell their vegetables to the Company and passing ships to obtain an income. The opportunities to become a successful entrepreneur were abundant and many skilled Europeans applied for free burgher status. The VOC had built a corn mill which was operated by the use of horses, but after a short time it was decided to make use of river water as a motive power. The tender for the construction of the mill was awarded to free burgher Wouter Mostert and when it was in working order he took charge of it and received income on shares of payments made for grinding.

Some of the men who had received land established themselves as farmers while others took service with the farmers as farm workers. Leendert Cornelissen, a ships carpenter, received a grant of a strip of forest at the foot of the mountain. His object was to cut timber for sale, all kinds of which prices were fixed by the council while Elbert Dirksen and Hendrik van Surwerden made a living as tailors. Most received their free papers because they possessed a certain useful skill such as Christian Janssen and Peter Cornelissen who had been expert hunters in the Company's service. Most free burghers negotiated deals with the VOC which were beneficial to both the Company and the burgher such as Dr Jan Vetteman, the surgeon of the fort, who arranged for a monopoly of practice in his profession.

Applicants received land in accordance to the purposes for which the land was to be used while carefully taking into consideration the set of skills and experiences possessed by each individual. Roelof Zieuwerts, for instance, received a small piece of forest where he could make a living as a wagon and plough maker. Martin Vlockaart, Pieter Jacobs and Jan Adriansen maintained themselves as fishermen, while Pieter Kley, Dirk Vreem, and Pieter Heynse made a living by sawing and selling yellow wood plank as well as to work their occupation as carpenters.

Slaves 

The merchant vessel named Amersfoort had captured 250 Angolan slaves, mostly children, from a Portuguese slaver on the Brazilian coast. The vessel arrived on the 28th of March 1658 at Table Bay. The settlers assisted the people on board of the ship with refreshments. The tedious journey at sea had its toll on the crew and slaves as the Amersfoort arrived with 323 men whereof 29 dead and 30 sick. Jan van Riebeeck decided to start a school for the enslaved children, making sure they got a Christian Dutch education until they were old and strong enough to work for the Dutch settlers.

Education 

The first school to be built in South Africa was for the purpose of educating the rescued slaves from the Amersfoort. However, the school was later also used to educate the children of the free burghers. At school, the children were taught to read and write and to compile accounts in gulden and stuivers. The school fees were equal to one half shilling per month for each child of a burgher, enslaved and Khoisan children were taught free of charge or Pro Deo.

Governance

Trade 

During a visit from the commissioner Rijcklof van Goens in 1657, several regulations concerning the burghers were drawn up as well as copious instructions on general guidance of the government. The following restrictions were placed on servants of the Company, which greatly benefited the burghers since they were no longer regarded as servants.

Servants were prohibited from cultivating larger gardens than required for their own use
Burghers were allowed to purchase cattle from the Khoisan, provided they buy the cattle at the same price as the company were offering

Burgher Council 

The free burghers nominated persons among them who could serve as representatives at the Council meetings at the Cape. The first burgher Councillor (Dutch title: burgherraden), Steven Jansz, was appointed in 1657 by Rijcklof van Goens. The following year he was joined by his colleague Hendrik Boom to serve as burgherraden in the Council.

Dutch East India Company 

The high ranking commissioner Mattheus van der Broeck of the Dutch East India Company arrived at the settlement in early 1670 accompanied with a fleet of fifteen ships. After deliberation about the general functioning of the settlement, the high ranking officers issued several important written instructions which revealed the Company's position towards the free burghers. Commissioner Van der Broeck's visit reached the following conclusion.

The settlement did not produce sufficient grain for the consumption of the garrison and inhabitants resulting in the importation of a large quantity of rice yearly. It was decided that, in order to reduce costs, a large farming community consisting of 'free burghers' were to be established at Hottentots Holland. It was decided to raise the price for grain in order to encourage the free burgher farmers

The commissioner was not impressed with the canteens operated by the free burghers and limited the number of canteens to nine for the whole settlement, Jacob Rosendael was permitted to sell wine produced from his vineyard

The first tender for construction work in South Africa was awarded to free burgher Wouter Mostert, setting the precedent for public works tenders in future. In addition, it was decided that free burghers were allowed to tender for the supply of construction materials required by the Company

Free burghers were prohibited to trade livestock with the Khoisan, however licenses were granted to the burghers in order to hunt large game wherever they chose

Over the years the burghers became successful in farming to an extent that in 1695 the directors of the Company issued instructions that farming and cattle dealing should be given up by the Cape Government and food should be sourced directly from the burgher farmers through a tender process.

Burgher Militia 

The commissioner further instructed the Cape authorities to provide assistance to the free burghers not only for the sake of produce but in order to gain favour because of the assistance which they could present in time of war. During the time, in 1670, the free burghers constituted a company of militia eighty-nine strong.

Population growth

Dutch Free Immigrants 

The authorities of the East India Company had endeavoured to induce gardeners and small farmers to emigrate from Europe to South Africa, but with little success. Now and again they were able to send out to their eastern possessions a few families who were attracted by the tales of wealth. But the Cape had little charm in comparison. In October 1670, however, the Chamber of Amsterdam announced that a few families were willing to leave for the Cape and Mauritius during the following December. Among the new names of burghers at this time are found those of Jacob and Dirk van Niekerk, Johannes van As, Francois Villion, Jacob Brouwer, Jan van Eden, Hermanus Potgieter, Albertus Gildenhuis, and Jacobus van den Berg.

French Huguenots 

During 1688–1689, the colony was greatly strengthened by the arrival of nearly two hundred French Huguenots. Political refugees from the religious wars in France, following the revocation of the Edict of Nantes, they were settled at Stellenbosch, Drakenstein, Franschhoek ("French corner") and Paarl. The influence of this small body of immigrants on the character of the Dutch settlers was marked. The Company in 1701 directed that only Dutch should be taught in the schools. This resulted in the Huguenots assimilating by the middle of the 18th century, with a loss to the community in the use and knowledge of French. The little settlement gradually spread eastwards, and in 1754 the country as far as Algoa Bay was included in the colony.

Notes

References 

Cape Colony
History of South Africa

Settlers of South Africa